Pressure is force magnitude applied over an area. Overburden pressure is a geology term that denotes the pressure caused by the weight of the overlying layers of material at a specific depth under the earth's surface. Overburden pressure is also called lithostatic pressure, or vertical stress.

In a stratigraphic layer that is in hydrostatic equilibrium; the overburden pressure at a depth z, assuming the magnitude of the gravity acceleration is approximately constant, is given by:

  

Where:

  is the depth in meters. 
  is the overburden pressure at depth .
  is the pressure at the surface.
  is the density of the material above the depth .

In deep-earth geophysics/geodynamics, gravitational acceleration varies significantly over depth and  should not be assumed to be constant, and should be inside the integral.

Some sections of stratigraphic layers can be sealed or isolated. These changes create areas where there is not static equilibrium. A location in the layer is said to be in under pressure when the local pressure is less than the hydrostatic pressure, and in overpressure when the local pressure is greater than the hydrostatic pressure.

See also
Effective stress
Lateral earth pressure
Pore water pressure
Sedimentary rock

References

Geophysics
Soil mechanics